The 2002 Women's Hockey International Challenge was a women's field hockey tournament, consisting of a series of test matches. It was held in Perth and Sydney, from 13 to 23 June 2002.

South Korea won the tournament after defeating Australia 1–0 in the final. Japan finished in third place after defeating the Australian Institute of Sport 3–1 in the third place playoff.

Competition format
The tournament featured the national teams of Australia, Japan and South Korea, as well as a team from the Australian Institute of Sport. The teams competed in a double round-robin format, with each team playing each other twice. Three points were awarded for a win, one for a draw, and none for a loss.

Squads

Head Coach: David Bell

Head Coach: Akihiro Kuga

Head Coach: Lim Heung-Sin

Results

Preliminary round

Pool

Fixtures

Classification round

Third and fourth place

Final

Awards

Statistics

Final standings

Goalscorers

References

Field hockey in Australia
Women's international field hockey competitions